This is the discography of rap group Outlawz below:

Albums

Studio albums
Still I Rise
Released: December 21, 1999
Label: Amaru, Death Row, Interscope
Chart position: #6 US
RIAA certification: Platinum
Ride wit Us or Collide wit Us
Released: November 7, 2000
Label: Outlaw Recordz, Bayside Entertainment
Chart position: #95 US
Novakane
Released: October 23, 2001
Label: Outlaw Recordz, Koch Records
Chart position: #100 US
Neva Surrenda
Released: October 22, 2002
Label: Outlaw Recordz, Rap-a-Lot Records
Outlaw 4 Life: 2005 A.P.
Released: April 19, 2005
Label: 33rd Street Records, 1Nation
We Want In: The Street LP
Released: August 5, 2008
Label: Gold Dust Media, 1Nation
Perfect Timing
Released: September 13, 2011
Label: Universal, Fontana, 1Nation, Ca$hville, Krude Productions Inc.
 Livin' Legendz
 Released: November 18, 2016
 Label: Black Market Records
#LastOnezLeft
Released: June 23, 2017
Label: Outlaw Recordz, Elder Entertainment
One Nation
Released: September 20, 2021
Label: Outlaw Recordz, Dough Networkz

Collaboration albums
Can't Sell Dope Forever (with Dead Prez)
Released: July 25, 2006
Label: Affluent Records

Digital albums
Retribution: The Lost Album
Released: 2006
Label: 1Nation/Outlaw Recordz
The Lost Songs Vol. 1
Released: March 23, 2010
Label: 1Nation/Outlaw Recordz
The Lost Songs Vol. 2
Released: March 23, 2010
Label: 1Nation/Outlaw Recordz
The Lost Songs Vol. 3
Released: March 23, 2010
Label: 1Nation/Outlaw Recordz

Mixtapes
 Outlaw Warriorz Vol. 1
 Released: June 22, 2004
 Label: Outlaw Recordz
 Outlaw Culture: The Official Mixtape
 Released: Mar 14, 2006
 Label: Outlaw Recordz
 Can't Turn Back
 Released: 2007
 Label: 1Nation, Ca$hville
 The Best of 2Pac & Outlawz
 Released: August 5, 2008
 Label: 1Nation
 Outlaw Culture Vol. 1 (Compilation)
 Released: 2009
 Label: 1Nation
 Outlaw Culture Vol. 2 (Compilation)
 Released: 2009
 Label: 1Nation
 Outlaw Culture Vol. 3 (Compilation)
 Released: 2009
 Label: 1Nation
 Cashville Takeover (with Young Buck, $o$a Da Plug and C-Bo)
 Released: February 3, 2009
 Label: Ca$hville
 Killuminati 2K10
 Released: October 31, 2010
 Label: 1Nation, Ca$hville, Thugtertainment, Krude Production Inc.
 Killuminati 2K11
 Released: July 14, 2011
 Label: 1Nation, Ca$hville, Thugtertainment, Krude Production Inc.
 Welcome 2 Cashville (with Ca$hville Records)
 Released: December 25, 2012
 Label: Ca$hville, Traps-N-Trunks
 Warrior Music (with Young Buck)
 Released: October 21, 2013
 Label: 1Nation, Ca$hville
 Inspirational Thug Musik Chapter 1 (with Aktual)
 Released: Nov 26, 2013
 Label: 1Nation, Options Ent.

Charted singles

Guest appearances 
1996: "All bout U" (2Pac featuring: Nate Dogg, Outlawz, Snoop Doggy Dogg, Dru Down)
1996: "Bomb First (My Second Reply)" (Makaveli featuring: Outlawz)
1996: "Just Like Daddy" (Makaveli featuring: Outlawz)
1996: "Life of an Outlaw" (Makaveli featuring: Outlawz)
1996: "Hail Mary" (Makaveli featuring: Outlawz)
1996: "Tradin' War Stories" (2Pac featuring: Outlawz, C-Bo, CPO Boss Hogg)
1996: "Thug Passion" (2Pac featuring: Outlawz, Jewell, DJ Quik)
1996: "When We Ride" (2Pac featuring: Outlaw Immortalz)
1997: "Starin' at the World Through My Rear View" (2Pac featuring: Outlawz)
1997: "Made Niggaz" (Makaveli featuring: Outlawz)
1997: "What's Ya' Fantasy" (Daz Dillinger Featuring: The Outlawz)
1997: "Lost Souls" (2Pac featuring: Outlawz)
1997: "Ain't Died in Vain" (Rondo featuring: Outlawz)
1997: "Enemies with Me" (2Pac featuring: Outlawz) 
1998: "Initiated"  (Daz Dillinger featuring: 2Pac, Outlawz, Kurupt)
1998: "Serenade My Life" (Gonzoe featuring: Outlawz)
1998: "This Life of Mine" (Bad Azz featuring: Outlawz and Prince Ital Joe)
1998: "Do Yo' Thug Thang" (Yukmouth featuring: Outlawz)
1998: "Still Ballin'" (Yukmouth featuring: Outlawz)
1998: "All Bout You (Remix)" (2Pac featuring: Outlawz, Nate Dogg, Dru Down, YGD Tha' Top Dogg)
1999: "How You Want It" (Big Mike featuring: Outlawz)
1999: "Immortal 2K" (5th Ward Boyz featuring: Outlawz)
2000: "Gun Talk" (Willie D featuring: Spice 1, Outlawz)
2000: "Ride or Die" (Sean T featuring: Outlawz)
2001: "We Gone Ride" (Yukmouth featuring: Hussein Fatal, Outlawz)
2001: "Hate the Game" (Killa Tay featuring: Outlawz and Luni Calone)
2001: "Breathin'" (2Pac featuring: Outlawz)
2001: "All Out" (2Pac featuring: Outlawz)
2001: "M.O.B." (2Pac featuring: Outlawz)
2001: "World Wide Mob Figgaz" (2Pac featuring: Outlawz)
2001: "U Don't Have 2 Worry" (2Pac featuring: Outlawz)
2001: "LastOnesLeft" (2Pac featuring: Outlawz)
2001: "Runnin' On E" (2Pac featuring: Outlawz)
2001: "First 2 Bomb (Original)" (2Pac featuring Outlawz)
2001: "They Don't Give a Fuck About Us (Original Mix)" (2Pac featuring Outlawz)
2002: "Sick Thoughts" (Big Syke featuring: Outlawz)
2002: "Born a Soulja" (Kastro and E.D.I. featuring: Yukmouth, Hellraza, Outlawz)
2002: "Ball or Die" (Hellraza featuring: Outlawz)
2002: "What U No Bout" (C-Bo featuring: Outlawz)
2002: "Turn da Heat Down" S(Spice 1 featuring: Outlawz)
2002: "Fuck Em All" (2Pac featuring: Outlawz)
2002: "Never B Peace" (2Pac featuring: Outlawz)
2002: "Whatcha Gonna Do" (2Pac featuring: Outlawz)
2002: "Late Night" (2Pac featuring: Outlawz and DJ Quik)
2002: "Fame" 2Pac featuring: Outlawz)
2002: "Catchin' Feelins" (2Pac featuring: Outlawz)
2002: "There U Go" (2Pac featuring: Outlawz and Big Syke)
2002: "This Life I Lead" (2Pac featuring: Outlawz)
2002: "They Don't Give a Fuck About Us" (2Pac featuring: Outlawz)
2003: "Ridin' for Pac" (Bullys wit Fullys featuring: Outlawz)
2003: "Hail Mary (Nu-Mixx)" (2Pac featuring: Outlawz and Prince Ital Joe)
2003: "Hit 'Em Up (Nu-Mixx)" (2Pac featuring: Outlawz)
2003: "One Day at a Time (Em's Version)" (2Pac and Eminem featuring: Outlawz)
2004: "The Uppercut" (2Pac featuring: Outlawz)
2004: "Black Cotton" (2Pac featuring: Outlawz, Eminem)
2004: "Where Will I Be" (Yaki Kadafi featuring: 2Pac and The Outlawz)
2004: "Neva' Can Say" (Yaki Kadafi featuring: The Outlawz)
2005: "Way Too Many" (Layzie Bone featuring: Outlawz)
2005: "Complicated" (Bone Brothers featuring: Outlawz)
2006: "Outlaws" (Belo Zero featuring: Outlawz)
2006: "Don't Stop" (2Pac featuring: Outlawz)
2007: "Bis ich unter der Erde lieg" ("Until I Lie Under The Earth") (Eko Fresh featuring: Outlawz)
2007: "Revolutie" (Kempi featuring: Outlawz)
2007: "Hail Mary (Rock Remix)" (2Pac featuring: Outlawz)
2007: "Got My Mind Made Up (Nu-Mixx)" (2Pac featuring: Outlawz and Kurupt)
2007: "Lost Souls (Nu-Mixx)" (2Pac featuring: Outlawz)
2007: "Picture Me Rollin' (Nu-Mixx) (2Pac featuring: Outlawz)
2008: "Cashville County" (Young Buck featuring: C-Bo, Outlawz)
2008: "Money Made Me Crazy" (Young Buck featuring: C-Bo, Outlawz)
2008: "They Fucks with Me" (Young Buck featuring: Sosa da Plug, Outlawz)
2009: "Fly" (Young Buck featuring: Sosa Tha Plug, Outlawz)
2009: "Ca$h-ville" (Cashis featuring: Young Buck, C-Bo, Sosa fa Plug, Outlawz)
2009: "Thug Life" (Al Massiva featuring: Outlawz)
2009: "Thuggin' 4 Life" (Infamous-C featuring: Outlawz and Kyle Rifkin)
2010: "Cleaned Off" (Young Buck featuring: Outlawz)
2012: "Can't Break Me" (C-Bo featuring: Outlawz) off Cali Connection
2012: "Son Of God" (Outlawz) off Strictly 4 Traps N Trunks 44: Free Young Buck Edition
2012: "What It Do" (Young Buck featuring: Sosa Tha Plug and Outlawz) off Welcome 2 Cashville
2013: "Betta Pray" (Da Mafia 6ix featuring: Outlawz and Lil Wyte)
2014-2017: "My Brother Keeper" (DJ Kay Slay featuring The Outlawz and Onyx) off The Last Hip Hop Disciple
2014-2017: "Shut Em Down" (MC Eiht featuring Outlawz) off Which Way Iz West
2017: "O4L" (Albanian Outlawz featuring Outlawz)

Music videos

As featured performer

See also
Tupac Shakur discography
Napoleon discography
Hussein Fatal discography
Young Noble discography
Big Syke discography
Mopreme Shakur discography

References

Hip hop discographies
Discographies of American artists